

Incumbents
President: Evo Morales

Events
9–25 February: 2 athletes from Bolivia compete at the 2018 Winter Olympics
13 February: A terrorist attack occurs in the city of Oruro.
6–18 October: Bolivia competes at the 2018 Summer Youth Olympics

Deaths
19 February: Teresa Gisbert, 91, architect and art historian.
19 March: Julio Garrett Ayllón, 92, politician, lawyer and ambassador, Foreign Minister (1979–1980) and Vice President (1985–1989).

1 April: Julia Vargas-Weise, 76, Bolivian photographer, screenwriter, and film director (Sealed Cargo)
29 April: Luis García Meza, 88, Bolivian general and politician, President (1980–1981)

References

 
2010s in Bolivia
Years of the 21st century in Bolivia
Bolivia